Beryl Esco Drummond (June 16, 1918 – April 26, 1982) was an American professional basketball player. He played in the National Basketball League for the Dayton Metropolitans during the 1937–38 season and for the Toledo Jeeps during the 1946–47 season; for his career he averaged 0.7 points per game.

References

1918 births
1982 deaths
American men's basketball players
United States Navy personnel of World War II
Basketball players from Ohio
Dayton Metropolitans players
Guards (basketball)
High school basketball coaches in the United States
Toledo Jeeps players
People from Gallia County, Ohio